CDEK is an express delivery company from Novosibirsk, Russia. It was founded in 2000.

History
The express delivery company was founded in Novosibirsk by graduates of the Novosibirsk State University Leonid Goldort and Vyacheslav Piksayev in 2000 to transport goods from the Korzina.ru online store to the cities of Siberia and the Russian Far East. A year later, the company began operating in Moscow, and two years later, in Saint Petersburg.

In 2020, the company invested more than 600 million rubles to create its own  network.

Geography
The company delivers goods to 195 countries and 36,000 localities in Russia.

Adresses
 Novosibirsk, Krivoshchyokovskaya Street, 15;
 Moscow, Zavoda Serp i Molot Proyezd, 3;
 Shanghai, Changning District, West Yang'An Street, 777.

Gallery

References

Companies based in Novosibirsk
Logistics companies
Transport companies established in 2000
Russian companies established in 2000
Express mail